The 1993 U.S. Cup was a round robin soccer tournament played in June 1993 and organized by the United States Soccer Federation. The United States hosted Brazil, England and Germany; all three of those countries were playing in their only U.S. Cup. The U.S. Cup began as a four-team invitational tournament in 1992 and would be played each year until 2000, except for the World Cup years of 1994 and 1998. The team with the best record at the end of the cup was crowned the cup champion. This year, Germany went on to win the title. England participated in the hope that they would be acclimatizing for the following year's World Cup, but in the end, they failed to qualify for that tournament.	

The final game of the tournament, between Germany and England, took place in the Pontiac Silverdome, an indoor stadium in Detroit, Michigan. This was the first soccer game played indoors on grass and it served as a test for the upcoming 1994 FIFA World Cup to be held in the United States. In that World Cup, several venues, such as the Silverdome, had complete roofs and the World Cup organizers wanted to test the feasibility of using grass on an indoor field.

6 June: United States vs Brazil

United States: Tony Meola, Desmond Armstrong, John Doyle, Mike Lapper, Fernando Clavijo, Jeff Agoos, John Harkes, Chris Henderson (Peter Woodring 69'), Bruce Murray (Cobi Jones 57'), Roy Wegerle, Jean Harbor (Earnie Stewart 46')

Brazil: Cláudio Taffarel, Winck, Julio Cesar, Márcio Santos, Branco (Nonato 46'), Luisinho (Rai 68'), Dunga, Boiadeiro, Valdeir, Careca, Elivelton (Cafu 76')

9 June: United States vs England

United States: Tony Meola, Desmond Armstrong, Mike Lapper, John Doyle, Jeff Agoos, Fernando Clavijo, Thomas Dooley (Alexi Lalas 69'), John Harkes, Tab Ramos (Cobi Jones 82'), Roy Wegerle, Eric Wynalda (Earnie Stewart 61')

England: Chris Woods, Lee Dixon, Gary Pallister, Carlton Palmer (Des Walker 61'), Tony Dorigo, David Batty, Paul Ince, Nigel Clough, Lee Sharpe, Les Ferdinand (Ian Wright 35'), John Barnes

English newspaper The Sun reported this result under the headline "Yanks 2 Planks 0".

10 June: Brazil vs Germany

Brazil: Cláudio Taffarel, Jorginho, Julio Cesar, Márcio Santos, Branco (Nonato 82'), Dunga, Valdeir (Almir 64'), Raí, Luisinho, Careca, Elivelton (Cafu 70')

Germany: Andreas Köpke, Stefan Effenberg, Thomas Helmer, Jürgen Kohler, Guido Buchwald, Andreas Möller, Michael Zorc (Thomas Strunz 58'), Lothar Matthäus, Matthias Sammer (Karl-Heinz Riedle 46'), Christian Ziege (Michael Schulz 74'), Jürgen Klinsmann

13 June: England vs Brazil

England: Tim Flowers, Earl Barrett, Des Walker, Gary Pallister, Tony Dorigo, Andy Sinton, David Batty (Platt 46'), Nigel Clough (Merson 82'), Paul Ince (Palmer 67'), Lee Sharpe, Ian Wright

Brazil: Cláudio Taffarel, Jorginho, Valber, Márcio Roberto dos Santos, Nonato (Cafu 5'), Luisinho (Palhinha 57'), Careca, Elivelton, Dunga, Valdeir (Almir 67'), Rai

13 June: United States vs Germany

United States: Tony Meola, Desmond Armstrong, John Doyle, Mike Lapper, Fernando Clavijo, Jeff Agoos (Alexi Lalas 67'), Thomas Dooley, John Harkes, Tab Ramos (Cobi Jones 78'), Roy Wegerle, Eric Wynalda (Earnie Stewart 60')

Germany: Andreas Köpke, Jürgen Kohler (Thomas Helmer 74'), Guido Buchwald, Michael Schulz, Stefan Effenberg (Andreas Möller 60'), Lothar Matthäus, Uwe Bein, Christian Ziege, Thomas Strunz, Karl-Heinz Riedle, Jürgen Klinsmann (Karlheinz Pflipsen 70')

19 June: Germany vs England

Germany: Bodo Illgner, Stefan Effenberg (Zorc 76'), Thomas Helmer, Guido Buchwald, Andreas Möller (Sammer 63'), Lothar Matthäus, Michael Schulz, Christian Ziege, Thomas Strunz, Karl-Heinz Riedle, Jürgen Klinsmann

England: Nigel Martyn, Earl Barrett, Gary Pallister (Keown 53'), Des Walker, David Platt, Paul Ince, Nigel Clough (Wright 70'), Andy Sinton, Paul Merson, John Barnes, Lee Sharpe (Winterburn 46')

Scorers
4 goals
 Jürgen Klinsmann

3 goals
 Karl-Heinz Riedle
 Thomas Dooley

2 goals
 Careca
 David Platt

1 goal
 Stefan Effenberg
 Andreas Möller
 Alexi Lalas
 Earnie Stewart
 Luís Carlos Winck
 Luisinho
 Márcio Roberto dos Santos

Final rankings

References

External links

Competition at the RSSSF

1993
1993 in American soccer
1992–93 in English football
1992–93 in German football
1993 in Brazilian football
June 1993 sports events in the United States